The Campeonato Nacional de Infantis is a defunct Portuguese competition for teams made up of players under 13 years old. It was played between 1987 and 1997. Today only regional tournaments exist for this age group.

Winners

Performance by club

References

Defunct football leagues in Portugal